Jan Wielopolski (c. 1700–1773) was a Polish nobleman (szlachcic).

Jan became Great Cześnik of the Crown, voivode of Sandomierz Voivodeship since 1750, starost of Lanckorona and Zagoje. Knight of the Order of the White Eagle, awarded on August 3, 1744 in Warsaw.

1700s births
1773 deaths
18th-century Polish nobility
Jan 1700-1773